The Júcar or Xúquer is a river in Spain, on the Iberian Peninsula. The river runs for approximately 509 km from its source at Ojuelos de Valdeminguete, on the eastern flank of the Montes Universales, Sistema Ibérico. Its most important tributary is the Cabriel.

River Júcar flows first southward and then eastward through the towns of Cuenca, Alcalá del Júcar, Cofrentes, Alzira, Sueca and Cullera, a town located near its mouth into the Gulf of Valencia, Mediterranean Sea. It crosses the provinces of Cuenca, Albacete and Valencia

In 1982 the river Júcar broke the Tous's reservoir, causing the biggest flood in Spanish history with a flow speed of 16,000 cubic metres per second, killing more than 30 people. This flood was the most important one in the whole history of Spain in that times because the people thought that the Tous reservoir was indestructible. The flood was called La pantanada de Tous.

See also 
 List of rivers of Spain
 Rambla del Poyo

References

External links 

 Confederació Hidrogràfica del Xúquer
 Plataforma Xúquer Viu
 Projecte de seguiment de la qualitat del Xúquer

Rivers of Spain
Rivers of the Valencian Community
European drainage basins of the Mediterranean Sea